Escape the Fate is an American rock band from Las Vegas, Nevada, formed in 2005 and originally from Pahrump, Nevada. The group consists of Robert Ortiz (drummer and backing vocalist), Craig Mabbitt (lead vocalist), TJ Bell (rhythm guitarist and vocalist), Erik Jensen (bassist and backing vocalist) and Matti Hoffman (lead guitarist). The group was founded by original vocalist Ronnie Radke, bassist Max Green and lead guitarist Monte Money. The band has had 11 official members and 7 touring members and throughout 2010–2022 had a fluctuating lineup, and has recorded seven albums with four different studio lineups.

The band had their first lineup change when keyboardist and backing vocalist Carson Allen, left before the band's first studio album Dying is Your Latest Fashion, and lead guitarist Monte Money started playing keyboards along with guitar instead of getting a new keyboardist. The band's next lineup change came with rhythm guitarist Omar Espinosa left and was replaced by Monte Money's brother, Michael Money as a touring member and Monte played the rhythm guitar on records.

Later, Ronnie Radke was involved in an altercation in Las Vegas that resulted in the fatal shooting of 18-year-old Michael Cook. While Radke did not shoot Cook, he was indicted on battery charges, while the man who shot Cook claimed self-defense. These charges against Radke, combined with Ronnie's past troubles with narcotics and rehab, led to a sentence of five years' probation. Radke failed to report to his parole officer and was arrested in June 2008, where he was sentenced to two years in prison. Radke was officially fired from Escape the Fate in mid-2008. Radke was then replaced by former blessthefall vocalist, Craig Mabbitt.

The band's next lineup change would come in late 2011, when the Money brothers and Max Green went on hiatus and were replaced by touring member Kevin "Thrasher" Gruft on lead guitar, TJ Bell on rhythm guitar and Zakk Sandler on bass. It was not an official departure at the time as the Money brother would return but Max Green would make his departure permanent. TJ Bell would then become an official member and switch to bass. In 2013 the band recorded their first album without Green and with Bell on bass. Later that year Monte and Michael would leave the band. TJ then switched to rhythm guitar, Kevin Gruft re-joined the band as a permanent member this time on lead guitar and Max Green returned to the band on bass. In 2014 Green would leave once more, then joined former vocalist Ronnie Radke's band Falling in Reverse, and left that band as well months after joining. Since 2014 the band has gone through a string of touring bassists who include Davey Richmond in (2014), Alex Torres (2014–2015), Tyler Burgess (2015), Max Georgiev (2015–2017)  and Erik Jensen since 2017 but in 2022 he became permanent bassist. With the band not having an official bassist, TJ and Kevin played bass in addition to their regular instruments from Hate Me to Chemical Warfare.

The band line-up next changed in late 2021, as Robert Ortiz and Kevin "Thrasher" Gruft went on hiatus and were replaced by touring members Blake Bailey on drums and Matti Hoffman on lead guitar. Robert Ortiz returned after recovering from injury, but Kevin "Thrasher" Gruft did not confirm his departure and the band subsequently removed him from their social pages and added Erik Jensen as permanent bassist after 5 years touring with the band.

Official members

Current

Former

Other contributors

Touring

Session

Timeline

References

Musicians from Las Vegas
Escape the Fate